WZHR (1400 AM) is a radio station broadcasting a talk format licensed to Zephyrhills, Florida, United States. The station is currently owned by Radio World, Inc.

WZHR is a part of the Tan Talk Radio Network, whose programming can also be heard on WTAN (1340 AM) in Clearwater, WDCF (1350 AM) in Dade City and translator station W282CC 104.3 FM Zephyr Hills.

History

WZRH and WPAS
WZRH began broadcasting May 9, 1962, nearly 18 months after receiving its construction permit on December 21, 1960. The 250-watt station was owned by the Zephyr Broadcasting Company and affiliated with station WORT of New Smyrna Beach until being sold the next year to Paul Lasobik, a building contractor from Toledo, Ohio. The call letters were changed to WPAS on October 2, 1963, coinciding with the sale.

The station was sold in early 1968 to the Art Advertising Company, owned by Robert, Joseph and Adam Artabasy; under Art, the station was approved to increase its power from 250 to 1,000 watts later that year. Two years after taking ownership, disaster struck. In the early morning hours of January 22, 1970, a fire tore through the station, destroying the newly installed transmitter, tape cartridges and office furniture; company paperwork was saved from the blaze. The fire started a spat with the local fire department, which billed the company for $246 in expenses incurred in fighting the blaze. Art would later file a suit against the Associated Press alleging that the fire was started by a defect in the station's Associated Press teletype machine; the station lost and was ordered to pay $3,500 to the news agency after breaching its contract.

A second event at the station that same year would spark additional legal disputes. In May 1970, three tape cartridge machines were stolen from WPAS. A former WDCF disc jockey, Tony Dexter, confessed to burglarizing WPAS. Charges against Webb were ultimately dismissed in 1975.

While the station grappled with the teletype fire lawsuit and the stolen equipment, Art Advertising was in financial trouble. In February 1972, former owner Lasobik won a judgment against Art for nonpayment, leading to the scheduling of a foreclosure sale for the station's license and assets. The sale was called off after Lasobik and Art reached a $29,000 settlement agreement. The FCC approved a sale of the station to Charles F. Wister in 1974; the sale was originally reported as not consummated before going through that August.

WPAS was sold to Mayo Communications of Plattsburgh, New York, in 1979. The new ownership, however, quickly turned sour. Wister filed a foreclosure lawsuit just six months after Mayo took over, alleging that the station was being so thoroughly mismanaged that he felt he would not get the money he was owed; it was behind on payroll taxes and payments to Wister. Mayo filed for bankruptcy protection, and David Ayres, former operations manager, was appointed as the station's receiver; Wister then went to work, at no cost, as a salesman to keep WPAS running. Wister emerged the owner again and held onto the station for another decade, moving it from its original location on U.S. Highway 301 to a shopping center in 1987. Wister was able to sell the station, this time for good, when Big Z Broadcasting, owned by the Zeplowitz family, purchased WPAS for $335,000 in 1989.

WZHR
In 1994, Zephyr Broadcasting, Inc., owner of WDCF, acquired WPAS for $200,000. The call letters were changed to WZHR on October 1, 1994, to symbolize the end of the bitter rivalry between the two outlets.

Wagenvoord Advertising Company, owner of WTAN (1340 AM) in Clearwater, acquired WDCF and WZHR in separate transactions in early 2002; the three stations began sharing programming, giving the three outlets a larger combined coverage area. His stations programmed a brokered talk format.

Dave Wagenvoord, owner of the group, died in 2014.

References

External links
wzhr.tantalknetwork.com

ZHR
1962 establishments in Florida
Radio stations established in 1962